Šušara is a village in Serbia. It is situated in the Vršac municipality, in the South Banat District, Vojvodina province. The village has a Hungarian ethnic majority (64.09%) and its population numbering 319 people (2002 census).

Population 
In the settlement Susara 296 adult inhabitants, the average age of the population live is 40.9 years (39.3 for men and 42.5 for women). The village has 139 households, the average number of members per household is 2.71.
The population in this village is very inhomogeneous and in the last three censuses were registered a decline in the population.

1894: 1044
1910: 946
1921: 1016
1948: 748
1953: 851
1961: 819
1971: 648
1981: 496
1991: 472
2002: 416
2011: 319

Gallery

See also
List of places in Serbia
List of cities, towns and villages in Vojvodina

References
 Book 1, Population, national or ethnic origin, the data on settlements, the Republic Institute for Statistics, Belgrade, February 2003, 
Book 2, population, gender and age, data on settlements, the Republican Institute for Statistics, Belgrade, February 2003, 
Milan Marina, Historical population 1948 - 2002., (Broj stanovnistva, 1948–2002)
Slobodan Ćurčić, Broj stanovnika Vojvodine, Novi Sad, 1996.

External links
Vue satellitaire de Šušara
Šušara

Populated places in Serbian Banat
Populated places in South Banat District
Vršac